Toshimitsu Kai (born 27 July 1956) is a Japanese professional golfer.

Kai played on the Japan Golf Tour, winning twice.

Professional wins (6)

Japan Golf Tour wins (2)

Japan Golf Tour playoff record (1–0)

Japan Challenge Tour wins (1)
1987 Sports Shinko Open

Other wins (3)
1979 Mizuno Pro Rookies Tournament
1981 KSB Kagawa Open
1986 Wakayama Open

External links

Toshimitsu Kai at the PGA of Japan official website

Japanese male golfers
Japan Golf Tour golfers
Sportspeople from Miyazaki Prefecture
1956 births
Living people